Dharmanandan Diamonds (also known as DDPL) is an Indian diamond manufacturing company headquartered in Mumbai, Maharashtra, India and has manufacturing facility in Surat, Gujarat, India, that manufactures diamonds and jewelry.

History
In the year 1985, two friends and then diamond merchants in Surat, Laljibhai Patel and Tulshibhai Goti, founded a small diamond manufacturing unit named Shreeji Gems. Shreeji Gems witnessed moderate growth and in the year 1993, it was registered as a partnership firm and renamed Dharmanandan Diamonds. The business continued to grow and later after 14  years, on 31  August  2007, it was formally incorporated as Dharmanandan Diamonds Pvt. Ltd.

Business activities
DDPL mainly focuses on cutting and polishing quality diamonds, which it eventually sells to retailers and jewelers across the globe. The company manufactures diamonds in various shapes and sizes, ranging from 0.01  carat to 10  carat and distributes its products through its sales offices at Hong Kong, the United States and Belgium. Moreover, it also enables consumers to buy diamonds and Jewellery online through its website. 
In 2008, Dharmanandan Diamonds achieved status of Sightholder and is on De Beers Global Sightholder Sales's (DBGSS) list since then.

Laljibhai Patel has purchased Indian Prime minister Narendra Modi's suit in 4 crore 31 lakh rupees. In 2019, Dharmanandan Diamonds Pvt. Ltd. was admitted to the American Gem Society as a Registered Supplier.

Diamond shapes 
In 2018, Dharmanandan Diamonds Pvt. Ltd. signed a globally exclusive agreement with Canadian Master Diamond Cutter- Mike Botha to cut, polish, market and distribute the  collection of patented diamond shapes marketed under the Sirius Star®...the world's brightest diamond® banner.

Recognition
One of the Best Cut and Polished Diamond - Large Exporter and Most Socially Responsible Company - 2012-2013 by GJEPC (Gem and Jewellery Export Promotion Council), India 
Sustainability Initiatives of the Year 2012-2013 by JNA (Jewellery News Asia) 
Annual Award 2011-2012 by GJEPC (Gem and Jewellery Export Promotion Council), India 
Employer of the Year Award 2011-2012 by JNA (Jewellery News Asia) 
Annual Award 2010-2011 by GJEPC (Gem and Jewellery Export Promotion Council), India 
Niryat Shree Gold Trophy 2009-2010 by FIEO, Federation of Indian Export Organisations 
Annual Award 2009-2010 by GJEPC (Gem and Jewellery Export Promotion Council), India 
Annual Award 2008-2009 by GJEPC (Gem and Jewellery Export Promotion Council), India 
Annual Award 2007-2008 by GJEPC (Gem and Jewellery Export Promotion Council), India 
Annual Award 2006-2007 by GJEPC (Gem and Jewellery Export Promotion Council), India 
Niryat Shree Gold Trophy 2005-2006 by FIEO (Federation of Indian Export Organisations) 
Niryat Shree Gold Trophy 2004-2005 by FIEO, (Federation of Indian Export Organisations)
Niryat Shree Gold Trophy 2003-2004 by FIEO, (Federation of Indian Export Organisations)
Niryat Shree Gold Trophy 2002-2003 by FIEO, (Federation of Indian Export Organisations)

References

External links

 Jewelry website development
 Luxury Brand Jewelry
 DTC Confirms Sightholder List
 
 
 GIA Holds Inaugural Global Leadership Program At Harvard Business School
 

 Diamond dealers
 Manufacturing companies based in Mumbai
 Diamond industry in India
2007 establishments in Maharashtra